Joseph Steven Lynch is an English professional footballer who plays as a midfielder for Chester.

Career
After playing for Crewe Alexandra, Lynch signed for Morecambe on non-contract terms in July 2019. He made his first-team debut on 3 September 2019 in the EFL Trophy. He left the club in January 2020. He signed for Lower Breck in September 2020. He moved to Runcorn Linnets in May 2021. Lynch followed manager Calum McIntyre to National League North club Chester in June 2022.

Career statistics

References

1999 births
Living people
English footballers
Crewe Alexandra F.C. players
Morecambe F.C. players
Lower Breck F.C. players
Runcorn Linnets F.C. players
Chester F.C. players
North West Counties Football League players
Northern Premier League players
Association football midfielders